Time and attendance systems (TNA) are used to track and monitor when employees start and stop work. A time and attendance system enables an employer to monitor their employees working hours and late arrivals, early departures, time taken on breaks and absenteeism. It also helps to control labor costs by reducing over-payments, which are often caused by paying employees for time that are not working, and eliminates transcription error, interpretation error and intentional error. TNA systems can also be used to ensure compliance with labor regulations regarding proof of attendance.

Manual systems 

Traditionally manual systems were used that rely on paper cards which have times stamped onto them using a time stamping machine. Such machines were used for over a century but have since been phased out and replaced with cheaper automated systems which eliminate the need for payroll staff to manually input employee hours.

Automated systems 

Modern automated time and attendance systems require employees to touch or swipe to identify themselves and record their working hours as they enter or leave the work area. Originally this consisted of using a RFID electronic tag or a barcode badge but these have been replaced by biometrics (vein reader, hand geometry, fingerprint, or facial recognition), and touch screens devices.

Application based systems 

The latest technology allows the use of app (Application software) based Geo-fence capabilities. Allowing an employee to clock in & out only when they are within an Internet geolocation. Facial recognition systems are also available with these app based software technologies, eliminating the need of Fingerprint scanners.

See also
 Comparison of time-tracking software
 Time tracking software
 Workforce management

References

Human resource management
Working time